Little Creek is a  long 3rd order tributary to Broad Creek in Sussex County, Delaware.

Variant names
According to the Geographic Names Information System, it has also been known historically as:
Meadow Branch

Course
Little Creek is formed at the confluence of Meadow Branch and Holly Branch about 1 mile south of Laurel, Delaware and then flows north into Broad Creek at Laurel.

Watershed
Little Creek drains  of area, receives about 45.0 in/year of precipitation, has a topographic wetness index of 746.39 and is about 10% forested.

See also
List of Delaware rivers

References

Rivers of Delaware
Rivers of Sussex County, Delaware
Tributaries of the Nanticoke River